The World Tourism rankings are compiled by the United Nations World Tourism Organization as part of their World Tourism Barometer publication, which is released up to six times per year. In the publication, destinations are ranked by the number of international visitor arrivals, by the revenue generated by inbound tourism, and by the expenditure of outbound travelers.

Most visited destinations by international tourist arrivals
In 2019 there were 1.459 billion international tourist arrivals worldwide, with a growth of 3.7% as compared to 2018. The top 10 international tourism destinations in 2019 were:

Africa
In 2019, there were 69.9 million international tourist arrivals to Africa (excluding Egypt and Libya), an increase of 2.4% from 2018. In 2019, the top ten African destinations were:

Americas
In 2019, there were 219.1 million international tourist arrivals to the Americas, an increase of 1.5%. In 2019, the top ten destinations were:

Asia and the Pacific
In 2019, there were 360.7 million international tourist arrivals to Asia-Pacific, an increase of 4.1% over 2018. In 2019, the top ten destinations were:

Europe
In 2019, there were 744.3 million international tourist arrivals to Europe, an increase of 3.9% over 2017. In 2019, the top ten destinations were:

Middle East
In 2019, there were 61.4 million international tourist arrivals to the Middle East (excluding Iran and Israel), an increase of 2.1% over 2018. In 2019, the top ten destinations were:

International tourism receipts
International tourism receipts grew to  billion in 2019, corresponding to an increase in real terms of 2.7% from 2018. The World Tourism Organization reports the following destinations as the top ten tourism earners for the year 2019, with the United States by far the top earner.

Africa

Americas

Asia and the Pacific

Europe

Middle East

International tourism expenditure
The World Tourism Organization reports the following source markets as the top ten spenders on international tourism for the year 2019, with China by far being the top spender:

See also
List of cities by international visitors
Tourism
World Travel Monitor

References

External links
 
 List of countries by international inbound tourists

Lists of countries by economic indicator
International rankings
Tourism-related lists
World Tourism Organization